The Fender 1000 is a model of pedal steel guitar manufactured by Fender in the 1950s and 1960s.

History 

Fender began producing the 1000 in 1957.  It was marketed alongside its single-neck sibling, the Fender 400 At the time it was an innovative instrument but was quickly made obsolete as pedal steel players began to standardize on Emmons and Day setups requiring ten strings and knee levers in addition to pedals.

Details 

The guitar features two necks and eight pedals which act on the finger changers of either neck via a system of cables and pulleys.  Each string may be pulled up or down in pitch.  The adjusted pitch is adjusted via screws exposed on the right side of the instrument.

Other details such as foot pedal construction and bridge design also varied over the production life of the instrument.

The electronics feature a tone pot, volume pot, and three-way switch which selects between either neck's pickup or combines them.

The bridge assembly on some Fender 1000s incorporates a patented mute feature which enables either neck's strings to be muted by raising a rubber mute underneath the strings behind the pickup.  The mute is activated by a lever at the rear of the bridge cover.

For transportation the guitar separates into body and a collection of pedals, pedal bars, and legs, which then pack into two cases.

Tunings 

Fender recommended an A6th tuning on the front neck with six of the eight pedals acting on this tuning.  On the rear neck E7th was recommended with the remaining two pedals modifying this tuning.

References

Continuous pitch instruments
Fender electric guitars